The All-Asian Intervarsity Debating Championships was an annual debating tournament for teams from universities in Asia.

Past Finalists & Hosts

Best Speakers of the Tournament

Controversy 

Institutions who were unhappy about aspects of the organisation of the All-Asian Intervarsity Debating Championships established the Asian Universities Debating Championship in 2005 as an alternative to the All-Asians Championship. Since then, many universities in Asia with strong debating traditions – most notably universities from the Philippines and Singapore, including all except one of the institutions who won the All-Asian championships up to 2004 – have chosen not to participate in the All-Asian Intervarsity Championships and have instead entered teams in the Asian Universities Debating Championship.

While not necessarily intended to be a rival tournament, the last three AUDCs coincided with the schedule of the All-Asian Championship, which made it impracticable for teams to attend both tournaments.

Universiti Kebangsaan Malaysia, which was one of the founding institutions of AUDC and entered teams in the AUDC in 2005 and 2006, chose to attend the All-Asians Championship in 2007. Among the universities that won the All-Asians prior to the split, they are the only institution to have participated in the All-Asians since the inception of the AUDC. They attended AUDC again in 2008.

References

External links 
 World Debate Website page on the All-Asian Intervarsity Debating Championships
 2007 All-Asian Intervarsity Debating Championship website

Asian debating competitions